Hart Creek may refer to:

Hart Creek (Georgia)
Hart Creek (Spotted Bear River tributary), a stream in Montana
Hart Creek (South Dakota)